A pumpkin seed, also known in North America as a pepita (from the Mexican , "little seed of squash"), is the edible seed of a pumpkin or certain other cultivars of squash. The seeds are typically flat and asymmetrically oval, have a white outer husk, and are light green in color after the husk is removed. Some pumpkin cultivars are huskless, and are grown only for their edible seed. The seeds are nutrient- and calorie-rich, with an especially high content of fat (particularly linoleic acid and oleic acid), protein, dietary fiber, and numerous micronutrients. Pumpkin seed can refer either to the hulled kernel or unhulled whole seed, and most commonly refers to the roasted end product used as a snack.

Cuisine

Pumpkin seeds are a common ingredient in Mexican cuisine and are also roasted and served as a snack. Marinated and roasted, they are an autumn seasonal snack in the United States, as well as a commercially produced and distributed packaged snack, like sunflower seeds, available year-round. Pepitas are known by their Spanish name (usually shortened), and typically salted and sometimes spiced after roasting (and today also available as a packaged product), in Mexico and other Latin American countries, in the American Southwest, and in specialty and Mexican food stores.

The earliest known evidence of the domestication of Cucurbita dates back 8,000–10,000 years ago, predating the domestication of other crops such as maize and common beans in the region by about 4,000 years. Changes in fruit shape and color indicate intentional breeding of C. pepo occurred by no later than 8,000 years ago. The process to develop the agricultural knowledge of crop domestication took place over 5,000–6,500 years in Mesoamerica. Squash was domesticated first, with maize second, followed by beans, all becoming part of the Three Sisters agricultural system.

As an ingredient in mole dishes, they are known in Spanish as pipián. A Mexican snack using pepitas in an artisan fashion is referred to as pepitoría.

The pressed oil of the roasted seeds of a Cucurbita pepo subsp. pepo var. 'styriaca' is also used in Central and Eastern Europe as cuisine. An example of this is pumpkin seed oil. Pumpkin seeds can also be made into a nut butter.

Pumpkin seeds can also be used steeped in neutral alcohol, which is then distilled to produce an eau de vie.

A salsa made of pumpkin seeds known as sikil pak is a traditional dish of the Yucatán.

Nutrition

Dried, roasted pumpkin seeds are 2% water, 49% fat, 15% carbohydrates, and 30% protein (table). In a 100 gram reference serving, the seeds are calorie-dense (574 kcal), and a rich source (20% of the Daily Value, DV, or higher) of protein, dietary fiber, niacin, iron, zinc, manganese, magnesium, and phosphorus (table). The seeds are a moderate source (10–19% DV) of riboflavin, folate, pantothenic acid, sodium, and potassium (table). Major fatty acids in pumpkin seeds are linoleic acid and oleic acid, with palmitic acid and stearic acid in lesser amounts.

Oil
Pumpkin seed oil, a culinary specialty in and important export commodity of Central Europe, is used in cuisine as a salad and cooking oil.

The following are ranges of fatty acid content in C. maxima pepitas:

The total unsaturated fatty acid concentration ranged from 9% to 21% of the pepita.  The total fat content ranged from 11% to 52%.  Based on the quantity of alpha-tocopherol extracted in the oil, the vitamin E content of twelve C. maxima cultivar seeds ranged from 4 to 19 mg/100 g of pepita.

Traditional medicine

Pumpkin seeds were once used as an anthelmintic in traditional medicine to expel tapeworms parasites, such as Taenia tapeworms. This led to the seeds being listed in the United States Pharmacopoeia as an antiparasitic from 1863 until 1936.

Market
Due to their versatility as a food product ingredient or snack, pumpkin seeds are projected to grow in sales by 13% annually and reach $631 million from 2020 to 2024.

See also
 Cucurbitacin
 Cucurbitin
 Egusi
 List of edible seeds
 List of squash and pumpkin dishes

References

Edible nuts and seeds
Mexican cuisine
Squashes and pumpkins
Squash and pumpkin dishes